Moussa Narry (born Moses Narh on 19 April 1986) is a former professional footballer who played as a defensive midfielder. Born in Niger he made six appearances for the Ghana national team.

Club career
Born in Maradi, Niger, Narry began his career with Sahel SC before joining Tunisian club Étoile Sportive du Sahel in 2006. After two years for Étoile du Sahel, during which he won the CAF Champions League with the side, he signed with AJ Auxerre in July 2008.

International career
Narry was a surprise choice as a Ghanaian international because it had always been assumed he hailed from neighbouring Niger. However, investigations into his heritage revealed he was born to a Ghanaian family. On 18 November 2007, he made his senior international debut for Ghana in a 2–0 win against Togo and on 18 December 2007, Narry was called up by Ghana as part of the 40-man squad for  training camp ahead of the 2008 Africa Cup of Nations. He also played at the 2010 Africa Cup of Nations. His only game was a 3–1 loss by Ivory Coast.

References

External links
 Étoile du Sahel Profile

Living people
1986 births
Nigerien people of Ghanaian descent
Ghanaian footballers
Nigerien footballers
Association football midfielders
Ghana international footballers
2010 Africa Cup of Nations players
Étoile Sportive du Sahel players
AJ Auxerre players
Ligue 1 players
Sahel SC players
Al-Orobah FC players
Sharjah FC players
UAE First Division League players
Saudi Professional League players
Ghanaian expatriate footballers
Expatriate footballers in France
Ghanaian expatriate sportspeople in Tunisia
Expatriate footballers in Tunisia
Expatriate footballers in Saudi Arabia